In baseball statistics, on-base percentage (OBP) measures how frequently a batter reaches base. An official Major League Baseball (MLB) statistic since 1984, it is sometimes referred to as on-base average (OBA), as it is rarely presented as a true percentage.

Generally defined as "how frequently a batter reaches base per plate appearance", OBP is specifically calculated as the ratio of a batter's times on base (the sum of hits, bases on balls, and times hit by pitch) to the sum of at bats, bases on balls, hit by pitch, and sacrifice flies. OBP does not credit the batter for reaching base on fielding errors, fielder's choice, uncaught third strikes, fielder's obstruction, or catcher's interference. 

OBP is added to slugging average (SLG) to determine on-base plus slugging (OPS). 

The OBP of all batters faced by one pitcher or team is referred to as "on-base against".

On-base percentage is calculable for professional teams dating back to the first year of National Association of Professional Base Ball Players competition in 1871, because the component values of its formula have been recorded in box scores ever since.

History 
The statistic was invented in the late 1940s by Brooklyn Dodgers statistician Allan Roth with then-Dodgers general manager Branch Rickey. In 1954, Rickey, who was then the general manager of the Pittsburgh Pirates, was featured in a Life Magazine graphic in which the formula for on-base percentage was shown as the first component of an all-encompassing "offense" equation. However, it was not named as on-base percentage, and there is little evidence that Roth's statistic was taken seriously at the time by the baseball community at large.

On-base percentage became an official MLB statistic in 1984. Its perceived importance jumped after the influential 2003 book Moneyball highlighted Oakland Athletics general manager Billy Beane's focus on the statistic. Many baseball observers, particularly those influenced by the field of sabermetrics, now consider on-base percentage superior to the  statistic traditionally used to measure offensive skill, batting average, which accounts for hits but ignores other ways a batter can reach base.

Overview
Traditionally, players with the best on-base percentages bat as leadoff hitter, unless they are power hitters, who traditionally bat slightly lower in the batting order. The league average for on-base percentage in Major League Baseball has varied considerably over time; at its peak in the late 1990s, it was around .340, whereas it was typically .300 during the dead-ball era. On-base percentage can also vary quite considerably from player to player. The highest career OBP of a batter with more than 3,000 plate appearances is .482 by Ted Williams. The lowest is by Bill Bergen, who had an OBP of .194.

On-base percentage is calculated using this formula:

where

H = Hits
BB = Bases on Balls (Walks)
HBP = Hit By Pitch
AB = At bat
SF = Sacrifice fly

In certain unofficial calculations, the denominator is simplified and replaced by Plate Appearance (PA); however, the calculation PAs includes certain infrequent events that will slightly lower the calculated OBP (i.e. catcher's interference, and sacrifice bunts). Sacrifice bunts are excluded from consideration on the basis that they are usually imposed by the manager with the expectation that the batter will not reach base, and thus do not accurately reflect the batter's ability to reach base when attempting to do so. This is in contrast with the sacrifice fly, which is generally unintentional; the batter was trying for a hit.

All-time leaders

Single-season leaders

See also

List of Major League Baseball career on-base percentage leaders
Moneyball: The Art of Winning an Unfair Game

Notes

References

Batting statistics
Baseball terminology
Percentages